Dr. Blasio Vincent Oriedo, in full Dr. Blasio Vincent Ndale Esau Oriedo (born 15 September 1931, Ebwali Village in Bunyore, Kenya Colony—died 26 January 1966, Aga Khan University Hospital, Nairobi, Kenya) was an African epidemiologist and a parasitological scientist known for his contributions to tropical medicine and work to stem disease epidemics in colonial and postcolonial Kenya, the countries of East and Central Africa, and the Sudan.  He is credited for saving thousands of native African lives from infectious disease. Dr. Oriedo was a recipient of the Extramural Medical Research Grant presented by the US National Institutes of Health (NIH).

Oriedo was a patron of academic, healthcare, and socioeconomic development in East and Central Africa. He developed an interdisciplinary approach that connected the struggle for political freedom in Kenya with fully integrated healthcare, intellectual, socioeconomic, and civil infrastructures especially in the rural regions that bore the brunt of disease epidemics and their socioeconomic and sociocultural consequences. He embraced a revolutionary epidemiological perspective towards the economic and intellectual consequences of disease or public health strategy across the East and Central African region. He served as a member of Tom Mboya's interdisciplinary economic development advisory team from 1965 until his death in January 1966.

Oriedo was one of the forces behind the late 1950s–early 1960s US academic scholarship programme for East African students— The Kennedy Airlift.

Biography 
Oriedo was born to Esau Khamati Oriedo (d. 1 December 1992) and Evangeline Olukhanya Ohana Analo-Oriedo (d. 11 July 1982), both from the western Kenya's Luhya ethnic group of the Bantu lineage. His father was a Kenyan politician (freedom fighter and colonial-era political detainee, district representative and once chairman of the North Nyanza Local Native Council), an entrepreneur, philanthropist, and a veteran of World Wars I and II. He was a Christian who challenged early white Christian missionaries in East Africa to embrace the African cultures as congruent with the Christian credo. His mother was an advocate of women's rights and literacy in Kenya. Oriedo was close to his mother, but his relationship with his father was strained. His formative years were spent with a paternal uncle, Bernard Walter Amukhale Oriedo.

He received early education at government and mission schools, and sat, successfully with distinction, for the Cambridge School Certificate in 1946 at the former Government African School at Kakamega in North Nyanza (present-day Kakamega High School at Kakamega in western Kenya).  He attended the Royal Institute of Medicine and Public Health at Nairobi; graduating in 1950. He was a licentiate of the Royal College of Physicians and Surgeons of Great Britain. He earned a doctor of public health (DPH) degree in epidemiological tropical medicine at the London School of Hygiene & Tropical Medicine a constituent college of the University of London. He was a fellow at the Dutch Royal Tropical Institute and Tulane University's Medical College's School of Tropical and Infectious Diseases in New Orleans. He attended and contributed to many scientific conferences and proceedings, lectures, and speaking engagements worldwide.

He was the first and the youngest native East and Central African epidemiologist in the field of tropical medicine and infectious diseases—both as researcher and a clinical practitioner—in the spread, control, and eradication of infectious agents. His parasitological epidemiology medical research and resulting treatments have received global acclaim and application. He was a champion of indigenous medical research and the dissemination of homegrown scientific medical information—such as, new clinical modalities, field studies and discoveries—via cooperation with indigenous and overseas scholarly publications, medical panels, and scientific proceedings. He foresaw this informational approach as an effective and dynamic forum for interchange of knowledge and viewpoints amongst various indigenous healthcare communities and their counterparts abroad; a mechanism for the documentation and dissemination of vital information on local diseases within the East and Central African region. His epidemiological medical research of the East African Leishmaniasis or kala-azar (black fever) has bred critical knowledge for worldwide use in both private and public health sectors, and civil societies.  In 1964 he attended, as an invited expert panelist, the XII International Congress of Entomology at London, United Kingdom.

He was a supporter of health care as a basic human right long before the 1978 Alma Ata Declaration proclamation.  In 1960 he directed a healthcare and hygiene strategy of tactical, strategic, operational, and performance indexing; a short-term and long-term planning strategy based on the application of preventative modalities that helped shift the medical science paradigm—in East Africa—away from the undue emphasis on curative means, and more so towards a balanced approach. That which effectually integrated strategic epidemiological knowledge with tactical, operational, and situational curative approaches. In the course of his tenure the region witnessed sustained improvement in schoolchildren's health and hygiene, public health (stemming of major disease epidemics and better sanitary conditions), and integration of interdisciplinary and interagency resourcing.

He promoted and nurtured coordinated approaches, amongst healthcare practitioners and related bodies, to facilitate the most effective seamlessly integrated dispensary and operations of public health and other civic and societal welfare services. As of 1950 until his abrupt and inexplicable death in 1966, he is credited with stemming the tide of numerous endemic and pandemic diseases in the East and Central African regions and the Sudan. The following are examples of those feats.

In October 1952, Oriedo's skills were put to the test when he was named to lead efforts to stem a major epidemic outbreak of a deadly parasitic visceral leishmaniasis (black fever) in Kenya, Uganda, and the Sudan. Oriedo moved to the District Hospital and Public Health Office at Kitui in south-eastern Kenya, the region hardest hit by the epidemic. He devised a strategy to stem the tide of the epidemic, and saved thousands of lives. In 1954 the disease was arrested.

In 1954 he led a successful government campaign to stem typhoid epidemic in present-day Kenya and Uganda. The North Kavirondo region of Mt. Elgon in Kenya—the Bungoma realm (presently Bungoma County in the former Western Province of Kenya) was one of hardest-hit areas. The disease threatened the ethnic Bukusu population. He built rapport with local native elders and traditional healers and halted the epidemic.

In 1960 the colonial authorities tasked him with formulating a roadmap to guide and coordinate an interterritorial, interdisciplinary and interagency crisis-management team to deal with a kwashiorkor crisis—a disease with high mortality-rates among infants and children. He successfully focused on the Kikuyu ethnic group, one of the localities where the disease was endemic. The lessons learnt from the Kikuyu campaign gave impetus to an effective regional strategy.

In 1959 he spearheaded an intensified malaria eradication campaign in the East African highlands that helped to reduce malaria epidemics in the region.

In 1964 he was a recipient of a coveted medical research grant furnished by the US National Institutes of Health (NIH), Extramural Research Program. He was a laureate and a tripartite fellow at the London School of Hygiene & Tropical Medicine, the Dutch Royal Institute, and Tulane University's Medical College's School of Public Health and Tropical Medicine.

A confidante of Tom Mboya, he allied with Mboya to successfully champion US education opportunities for East African Students.

He was a patron of academics, healthcare, and socioeconomic development in East Africa. While fighting disease epidemics across the region he remarked on the decrepit infrastructure in large the areas of the country to the detriment of socioeconomic, healthcare, and intellectual progress.  This experience led him to crusade for rural citizens. He declined a career in politics, despite being lobbied by his associates enter politics. Later he served, at Tom Mboya's behest, as a member of Mboya's multidisciplinary economic development team from 1965 until his death in January 1966.

He was a staunch opponent of fraud and abuse of the public trust; utterly stubborn—an uncompromising scrupulous—and demonstrative disdain for and impatient towards ineptitude. He was an outspoken critic of vice by those in power; thus, his policies became anathema to the rulers of colonial Kenya, and most postcolonial bureaucrats and political elites of the embryonic independent Kenya. In 1965, upon his return from a conference in the Netherlands and other official engagements in Europe, he summarily terminated the employment of several expatriates and native personnel for graft, ineptitude, and absconding from duty.  His actions met with ad hominem assaults from a cadre of bureaucrats and political elites; nevertheless, he stood his ground and refused to be intimidated into rescinding the edicts. His view was that these public servants worked solely to enrich and empower themselves.

He was a fluent speaker and writer of English, Dutch, Kiswahili, Luganda, Luhya, Dholuo, Kamba, and Kikuyu languages.

A cadre of multidisciplinary and racially diverse (Africans, Indo-Asiatics, Caucasians, Arabs, etc.) contemporaries from across East Africa flocked to his residence to indulge in social intercourse—interchange of ideals and ideas, entertainment, debate local and international affairs and geopolitics du jour. He was known to his contemporaries as "Jaraha"—a hybrid Kiswahili-Dhuluo idiom for "en vogue socialite" or the "cosmopolitan". His associates included Tom Mboya (d. 1969)—with whom they were confidantes; Sir Philip Edmund Clinton Manson-Bahr (d. 1966)—the son-in-law of Sir Patrick Mason, the doyen founder of the field of tropical medicine; Dr. Apollo Milton Obote—led Uganda to independence from Britain in 1962, becoming Prime Minister and the President twice; Prof. Hillary Ojiambo; Masinde Muliro; Charles Njonjo; Kitili Maluki Mwendwa; Elijah Wasike Mwangale; Paul Ngei; Fred Kubai; Achieng Oneko; Joseph Otiende; Dr Julius Gikonyo Kiano; Argwings Kodhek; Dr. B. A. Southgate—British Colonial Medical office, London; Dr. R. Bowen; and Dr. R. B. Heisch; to name but a few.

Early life 
Dr. BV Oriedo was born to Esau Khamati Oriedo (d. 1 December 1992) and Evangeline Olukhanya Ohana Analo-Oriedo (d. 11 July 1982), both from western Kenya's Luhya tribe of Africa's Bantu lineage. His mother was a homemaker, a domestic economics educator, and an ardent advocate of women rights. Whereas his father was a consummate Kenyan statesman, politician (1910s – 1960s), and an anti-colonialism activist and freedom fighter who had been detained, 1952–1956, alongside Paramount Chief Koinange and Jomo Kenyatta (the first President of the Republic of Kenya), and a cadre of other anti-colonialists during the campaign for Kenya's independence from the British rule. Esau Oriedo was also an entrepreneur and trade unionist, a staunch crusader of Christianity's embrace of indigenous African cultures, philanthropist, and a veteran of World War I and World War II as a soldier in the King's African Rifles (KAR) regiment of the British Army. Albeit enjoying a close relationship with his mother, the relationship with his father was estranged. He ran away from home as a child. His formative years were spent with his paternal uncle, Bernard Walter Amukhale Oriedo, who helped raise him. It has been argued that his uncle played an influencing role in Dr. BV Oriedo's decision to actualize a healthcare vocation even though his father had wanted him to pursue a business and political careers.

Education 
He received early education at government and mission schools, and sat, successfully with distinction, for Cambridge School Certificate in 1946 at the former Government African School at Kakamega in North Nyanza (present-day Kakamega High School at Kakamega in western Kenya).    He attended the prestigious Royal Institute of Medicine & Public Health (RIMPH), an elite conjoined Government College at Kabete in suburban Nairobi, Kenya which catered to cerebrally gifted scholars in East and Central Africa; where he pursued an interdisciplinary degree in medicine—with focus on public health, hygiene, and disease prevention medicine program. During his tenure of study at the Royal Institute of Medicine & Public Health, he secured an internship as a staff researcher assistant with the Division of Insect-Borne Diseases at Medical Research Laboratory, Nairobi. In 1950 he completed his college education at the RIMPH, graduating with high honours. In the same year of his college graduation he successfully completed the board certification exams, administered from London in Great Britain; he became a Licentiate of the Royal College of Physicians of London. The certification and licensure qualified him for a job classification of a senior public health officer — a rank exclusively earmarked for Briton or Caucasian medical expatriates possessing Great Britain medical degrees or analogous European qualifications. Moreover, his qualifications exceeded the requirements for employment by the Colonial Medical Service — the organization responsible for dispensation of healthcare services and policy initiatives in the British Overseas Territories. Instead, he was appointed to an inferior position as an African assistant medical officer (AAMO).  He remonstratively rebuffed the appointment; in 1951 he was actualized as a senior public health officer with de jure commission which permitted him to serve across the East and Central African region. He also qualified for assignments under the auspices of the Colonial Medical Service.[  In 1954 he received academic fellowship to study tropical medicine & parasitological epidemiology in the United Kingdom at the London School of Hygiene & Tropical Medicine. His research thesis was on the vector-borne tropical diseases; it focused on the epidemiology of East African leishmaniasis (kala-azar), and attained a DPH. In 1957 he was a recipient of an associate research scientist fellowship from Tulane University's Medical College's School of Public Health and Tropical Medicine at New Orleans in United States—he continued, fruitfully, to collaborate his work in East Africa with Tulane University until his precipitously inexplicable death in January 1966.  He was also a recipient of a research stipend awarded by the Dutch Royal Institute in the Netherlands; the institute actively promoted his research on the "vector-borne tropical diseases: epidemiology of East African leishmaniasis (kala-azar)” in the Netherlands and other European countries. He worked feverishly, with diligent acumen, effectively combining vocational duties and scholarship research with travel abroad to various international scholarly medical conferences and special proceedings to promote awareness of the tropical diseases in Africa; and to help stimulate funding for research and drug discovery to stem epidemics and other preventable diseases on the continent. An epic accomplishment for an under 30-year old native African at the apogee of European colonialism in East Africa!  In 1959 he gained full membership to The Royal Society of Tropical Medicine and Hygiene—a London-based organization promoting the study, control and prevention of tropical disease, and facilitation of discussion and exchange of information among those interested in tropical diseases and international health, and the overall promotion of the work of those interested in these objectives. In 1962, through his collaborative research with Tulane University's Medical College's School of Tropical and Infectious Diseases, he was endowed with a prestigious extramural medical research grant from the NIH—an agency of the United States Department of Health and Human Services.

Professional life 
Throughout his career he was tenured at the Ministry of Health and Housing, Nairobi, Kenya, and the Nairobi-based Division of Insect-Borne Diseases at Medical Research Laboratory under the auspices of the British Colonial Medical Services. The inception of his epidemiological vocation dates to 1950 after he attained a diploma in public health and preventive medicine (DPH)from the Royal Institute of Medicine & Public Health. At that same period, at the age nineteen, he became the youngest native person in the East and Central African region to autonomously engage in active interdisciplinary medical research in epidemiology and parasitology. After an efficacious completion of a London (Britain) administered board certification exams and licensure, he was actualized in 1951 to the rank of a senior (principal) public health officer under the auspices of the Ministry of Health and Housing, Nairobi, Kenya. Thus, becoming the first and the only native person, du jour, to hold such commission across the British East Africa Colony and Protectorate. He was later to become the first native East African epidemiologist in the field of tropical medicine and infectious diseases. He served as an epidemiologist in dual capacity under the aegis of the Colonial Medical Services and the Ministry of Health and Housing in the colonial and post-colonial Kenya. His consummate and pioneering parasitological epidemiology and medical research, and epidemiological mapping of pestilences and preventive modalities in the field of tropical medicine and insect-borne infectious diseases in East and Central African have received global acclaim and application. Antecedently, his interdisciplinary medical acumen; dedication to public service; selflessness; and ability to connect with local African villagers helped stem disease-epidemic outbreaks and save thousands of native lives; and to improve the quality of living across the East and Central African region and the Sudan. Mournfully, historiography focuses on either the European doctors or the non-white subordinates of the various African Colonial Medical Services, whereas non-white personnel, such as Dr. BV Oriedo who worked contemporaneously in higher status positions, have received very little attention or no acknowledgement.

In 1950 he was selected to lead a handful of medical students from Kenya to attend the Conference of the World Health Organization on Malaria at Kampala, Uganda.

Albeit tenured both at the Nairobi-based Division of Insect-Borne Diseases at Medical Research Laboratory[Notes 6], and the Ministry of Health and Housing during and post-colonial British rule, he shunned the city comforts du jour in the interest of serving the aboriginal populations of the African Great Lakes region, going to the fore personally. He spent most of his time in disease-ravaged remote villages, meticulously implementing curative and preventative measures; recording observations and mapping out diseases, authoring and disseminating reports.

His cerebral abilities and immense potential in the field of tropical medicine and infectious vector-borne diseases was, beforehand, recognized by Sir Philip Edmund Clinton Manson-Bahr, MD, (d. November 1966) of the British Colonial Medical Services and renowned for his contributions to tropical medicine; and the son-in-law of Sir Patrick Mason, the doyen founder of the field of tropical medicine. Sir Manson-Bahr enlisted the young researcher to assist in his work on tropical medicine and infectious diseases in East African[21]; and later, elsewhere within the British Empire, largely under the auspices of the Colonial Medical Service—the personnel section of the Colonial Service, employing the healthcare professionals who tended to the health of both the colonial staff and the local populations of the British Empire.

In 1951 Sir Manson-Bahr invited him to attend the "Conference of Specialists on infectious tropical diseases: Filariasis in the South Pacific", held at Papeete, Tahiti, August–September, 1951; of which Sir Manson-Bahr was a principle organizer and interlocutor.  Filariasis was increasingly of concern in the colonial East Africa du jour.

The two men would subsequently foster a close friendship and collaboration in the field of infectious diseases and tropical medicine. Moreover, Sir Manson-Bahr in conjunction with the British Colonial Medical Services and the East African Bureau of Research in Medicine and Hygiene (East Africa High Commission) featured markedly in the meritorious efforts that earned him a 1954 research fellowship to study tropical medicine & parasitological epidemiology in the United Kingdom at the London School of Hygiene & Tropical Medicine.

In 1964 he was invited to panel of specialists at the XII International Congress of Entomology at London, United Kingdom.

Campaign against infectious disease
He promoted and nurtured coordinated approaches, amongst healthcare practitioners and related bodies, to facilitate the most effective seamlessly integrated dispensary and operations of healthcare, socioeconomic, and other social welfare services. He was presciently cognizant of the adverse socioeconomic, sociocultural, and socio-ecological consequences of disease or injury on individuals, communities and civil infrastructures, or organizations. He effectively synergized with all key stakeholders, in a robust and dynamic interdisciplinary bilateral or multilateral partnership, via a wholesome stakeholder-engagement whose desired key outcome was to formulate and implement disease prevention initiatives that were evidence-based, and both practicable and transformative, tailored towards the target-population, and outcome-driven. These initiatives were performance indexed— vis-à-vis, delivering measurable performance.

As of 1950 until his abrupt and inexplicable death in 1966, he is credited with stemming the tide of numerous endemic and pandemic diseases in the East and Central African regions and the Sudan; and a forfending of thousands of human lives. In 1959 he spearheaded an intensified malaria eradication campaign in the East African highlands that helped to reduce malaria epidemics in the region.

Kala-azar (black fever) or visceral Leishmaniasis epidemic 
In October 1952 the young BV Oriedo's skills were put to the test when he was tasked to lead efforts to stem a major epidemic outbreak of black fever disease in Kenya, and parts of Uganda.  The epidemic had also manifested itself in the Sudan. Kala-azar (black fever) or visceral leishmaniasis is a deadly parasitic disease endemic to the tropics, subtropics, and southern Europe. He took a hands-on approach relocated himself to the remote hinterland outpost District Hospital and Public Health Office at Kitui in Kenya; the region hard-hit by the epidemic. He devised a savvy strategy to stem the tide of the epidemic, and saved thousands of lives. In 1954 the disease was arrested.

Typhoid fever epidemic 
In 1954 Oriedo led a successful government campaign to stem typhoid fever epidemic in present-day Kenya and Uganda. In the North Kavirondo region of Kenya's Mount Elgon District, Bungoma County was one of hardest-hit areas. The disease ravaged the ethnic Bukusu population. His efforts to halt the disease were recognized by the Bukusu people who honoured him as a great healer by granting him the honorary title of omukasa, a Bukusu chieftain. His accomplishment also earned him a research stipend from the London School of Hygiene & Tropical Medicine.

Kwashiorkor 
In the 1940s kwashiorkor was a yet ill-defined nutritional disorder in Africa. Mortality-rates among children were disturbingly high. In 1960, based on his prior successful campaigns against epidemic disease outbreaks, colonial authorities gave Oriedo the job of creating a roadmap to guide and coordinate the kwashiorkor crisis management team. Using available data, he focused on the Kikuyu ethnic group, in one of the localities where the disease was rampant. The Kikuyu campaign was successful. The lessons learnt from the Kikuyu campaign gave impetus to an effective national strategy. One of the key elements of the programme was a national school milk program which provided a daily milk ration to children during morning and afternoon recesses. Teachers were required to check pupils for health and hygiene during physical education (PE) periods and schools were charged with keeping up-to-date student immunisation records.

Plasmodium falciparum malaria epidemics campaign 
During the late 1950s and 1960s he championed, coordinated, and buoyed the campaign against malaria amongst African and Asian communities in East Africa where the disease epidemics was poignantly endemic and had exacted a heavy mortality toll. Those communities, especially the native African tribes were mostly remote and in disadvantaged settings. Preceding his efforts, those communities had received, at best, spasmodic attention from the colonial regime. For instance, the 1961 heavy rainfall brought flooding and the rise of the outbreaks of malaria epidemics that extended deeply into the hinterland. He was a major force behind the resourcefulness in formulating and implementing an extensive public health control program; elements of the program entailed leveraging-in successful aspects from the Nairobi campaign of 1940 epidemic, scouting and mapping out the breeding sites, conducting entomological and epidemiological studies, oiling and larviciding of stagnant waters and bushes, and mass chemoprophylaxis administration.  The approach succeeded in containing malaria epidemics in several remote and disadvantaged settings amongst Africans and Asiatics communities.

Situational, tactical, operational, and strategical national health system 
He was an unbendable crusader of an important performance indexed healthcare quality improvement program which raised immunization coverage levels of inoculation preventable diseases by lessening missed opportunities to vaccinate, vigilant administration of accountability requirements, and the overall improved standards of practices for health wellness and fitness, at all levels, in the Eastern Africa region. In 1960 he was one of the key architects of a dynamical interdisciplinary multicomponent and multigenerational public health, a healthcare and hygiene strategy of long-term planning based on the application of preventative modalities that helped shift the medical science paradigm—in East Africa—away from the undue emphasis on curative means, and more so towards a balanced approach; that which seeks to adapt public health strategies that effectively integrates epidemiological, parasitological, and etiological knowledge with tactical and situational curative approaches.The desired key outcomes included the prevention of disease or infectious agents, disability, malnutrition, and mortality rate—especially among the vulnerable populations of children, youth, and young adults—by means of immunization, hygiene, nutrition (e.g., providing free fluid whole milk for school children as part of his campaign against kwashiorkor epidemic outbreaks), and dietary supplement with multivitamins, and by control of contagious, parasitic and related diseases. The antecedent healthcare and hygiene strategy received the commendation of the British colonial East African High Commission and the British Colonial Medical Services in London; the strategy was adapted by the commission and Kenya's Ministry of Health and Housing. The program forms the organizational rudiments of the present healthcare and hygiene strategy in East Africa.

Dr. BV Oriedo, in person, conducted surprise compliance audits across mostly remote regions of Kenya and Uganda—he wrote meticulously cogent observations outlining his findings and recommendations for corrective measures, and a timeline for full compliance. In cases of systemic failures, he was known to summarily discharge the absconding individual(s).

An epidemiological perspective to economic consequences of disease 
A frontier statesman and a scientist he developed an interdisciplinarity pioneering approach that connected the struggle for political freedom in Kenya with fully integrated healthcare, intellectual, socioeconomic, and civil infrastructures; especially in the rural regions that bore the brunt of disease epidemics and its dire socioeconomic and sociocultural consequences. Antecedently, he embraced a revolutionary du jour epidemiological perspective towards the economic and intellectual consequences of disease or public health strategy across the East African region. Indeed, he understood that a viable independent Kenya would require not only a cadre of well-educated native professionals but also inevitably a sustainable robust and dynamic local healthcare and intellectual infrastructures able to fuel and drive a sustainable economic development, hence an equitable holistic wellness of all her peoples. To this effect, he ardently lobbied—albeit unsuccessfully—to adapt health care as an expressly stipulated right endowed under the new constitution of the nascent postcolonial Kenya. This prescient interdisciplinary consummate statesmanship made him distinct from the effusive political cadre of his contemporaries that are prominently chronicled with Kenya's freedom struggle.

Regulating native medicinal practices 
Throughout his career, Oriedo sought to regulate dubious folk medicine and mysticism that had remained a central sociocultural institution across East Africa. He was a vocal critic of indigenous practices that placed the well-being of native communities in peril and easy prey for quacks. He recommended founding an ethnomedicine advisory board, at the national and provincial levels, under the auspices of the Ministry of Health and Housing; a board whose composition would include traditional healers and modern healthcare practitioners.

Medical research 
In the 1950s Oriedo called for, and helped champion with the backing of Sir Manson-Bahr and B.A. Southgate, the creation of a peer-reviewed comprehensive healthcare reference database for East Africa akin to the United States National Library of Medicine. Similarly, he championed the creation of a robust and dynamic healthcare infrastructure in rural regions—a "National Reference Health Centre for Kenya".

In 1953 and 1954, he was an invited panelist at the East Africa High Commission Scientific Conference under the aegis of the London-based Colonial Office of United Kingdom. On 11 January 1961, an abstract of the first series of his epidemiological medical studies of East African Leishmaniasis (kala-azar) was presented before conference on "The Epidemiology of Arthropod-borne Diseases", at Nairobi. The work was well received, and has enjoyed sweeping application and has been widely cited. His work in tropical medicine, hygiene, and infectious diseases has been posthumously published by collaborators, such as fellow laureate Dr. BA Southgate, and others.

In 1964 he was a recipient of a coveted medical research grant furnished by the US National Institutes of Health (NIH), Extramural Research Program. The grant was in support of his epidemiological, parasitological, and etiological research in tropical medicine and infectious diseases in East Africa. Oriedo's work has received global acclaim and application.

Studies in the epidemiology and parasitology of East African Leishmaniasis 
Oriedo's Epidemiological and Parasitological Studies of East Africa Leishmaniasis led to the end of the October 1952 visceral leishmaniasis epidemic outbreak in Kenya. In 1952 he moved to the remote District Hospital and Public Health Office at Kitui to direct a campaign against a kala-azar epidemic outbreak. Kala-azar (black fever) or visceral leishmaniasis is a deadly parasitic disease in the tropics, subtropics, and southern Europe. The disease was first diagnosed in the Kitui region of Kenya in 1946. The Kitui epidemic threatened to wipe out entire ethnic Kamba villages. In 1954 the disease was arrested.

The disease remained ubiquitous in other regions of East Africa and the Sudan. Thus, with the encouragement and support of Sir P. E. C. Manson-Bahr and Dr. B. A. Southgate, he proposed a collaboration with Southgate and two other researchers at the Medical Research Laboratory's Division of Insect-borne Diseases at Nairobi to conduct epidemiological and parasitological studies of visceral leishmaniasis. The collaboration the foundation of his research studies at the London School of Hygiene & Tropical Medicine. His major collaborators were the London School of Hygiene & Tropical Medicine; Sir Philip Henry Manson-Bahr; East African High Commission's East Africa Bureau of Research in Medicine and Hygiene; the British Colonial Medical Services at London; Ministry of Health and Housing, Kenya; the Division of Insect-borne Diseases, Medical Research Laboratory, Nairobi; and Tulane University's Medical College's School of Tropical and Infectious Diseases in the United States.

His epidemiological and parasitological medical research and field observations of visceral leishmaniasis in East and Central Africa, and the Sudan revealed that under ceteris paribus male and female populations exposed to the disease experience different symptoms or sometimes no symptoms; further, the seropositivity rate was higher in females than the males; whereas, using the leishmanin skin test, higher prevalence in males has been recorded. His observations played a major role in the elucidation of the multi-etiological factors in the gestation of the disease; the delineation of which, is of the essence in precluding the misclassification of the induction and latent phases of the disease or infectious agents. Another key elucidation based on his work is that infected people are not needed to maintain the natural transmission cycle of the leishmania protozoan parasite; viz., the natural transmission cycle is sustainable by means of animal reservoir hosts along with sandflies. These findings helped pave the way for a more effective characterization of the incubation process of the disease through a more erudite complex multifarious modern epidemiological and parasitological approaches. This work has been widely cited and the complex multifarious approach widely applied.

Patron of academics 
Apart from Oriedo's contribution to the healthcare system in the East and Central Africa region, he was a patron of higher education. In the late 1950s (and thereafter) he was a silent force behind the fostering of indispensable rapports with likeminded contemporaries abroad that led to the inception of higher education opportunities in North America for talented East African students. During the colonial and embryonic postcolonial period, higher educational opportunities were inadequate for native African students. The higher education initiative (concept of opportunities in North America) resonated very well with his confidante and compatriot, Thomas Joseph Odhiambo "Tom" Mboya (d. July 1969)—a political figure in Kenya's liberation movement. The two friends were utterly indispensable in their combined efforts; moreover, they teamed up with other key protagonists, locally and abroad, to champion the programme as a key policy initiative. Some of these key partners included Senator John F. Kennedy, William X. Scheinman (businessman), Jackie Robinson (former baseball star), Harry Belafonte (singer and actor), and Sidney Poitier (actor); William X. Scheinman is undoubtedly the pillar that buttressed the campaign, and the engine and fuel that sustained the process—a man to whom Kenya owes a great debt. Tom Mboya played a key role in securing air transportation to North America, in September 1959, for the initial eighty-one students with scholarship in the United States and Canada. Thereafter, Mboya would become the dominant political face of this successful initiative. Perhaps the crowning achievement of the initiative was the 1959 founding of the African American Students Foundation (AASF), which further obtained hundreds of new scholarships in North America for students from the East African countries. In addition, the AASF raised funds for airfare and living expenses for the scholarship recipients. Moreover, the AASF, with the facilitation of John F. Kennedy, secured a contribution of US$200,000 from Joseph P. Kennedy Jr. Foundation that entailed the entire amount needed for the 1960–61 academic year airlift, and the assisting of students with basic living expenses in the United States.

Memberships 
 Royal Society of Tropical Medicine and Hygiene — London-based organization promoting the study, control and prevention of tropical diseases
 Royal Tropical Institute — a foundation in Amsterdam, The Netherlands
 Royal Society for Public Health, The U.K. — Sanitary Inspectors Association, Public Health
 Specialist Officer Staff Member—The East African High Commission's Bureau of Research in Medicine and Hygiene 
 East African Standing Advisory Committee for Medical Research.
 Collegiate Membership of the Royal Colleges of Physicians of the United Kingdom
 The British Medical Association (BMA)—Uganda and Kenya Branches (colonial era)
 The Kenya Medical Association (KMA)
 Kenya Medical Department of the colonial British East Africa
 Royal Entomological Society 
 International Congresses of Entomology

Awards and honors
 Research fellow — The London School of Hygiene & Tropical Medicine fellowship
 Research Grant & Travel Stipend — The Dutch Royal Institute, The Netherlands
 Extramural Medical Research Grant — The United States National Institute of Health (NIH) 
 NIH Fellow — The United States National Institute of Health (NIH)
 Bukusu Omukasa (a Bukusu folkloric healer or a paramount elder-leader) — Titular folkloric title conferred him by the Bukusu Kenyan ethnic group in gratitude of and respect for his successful campaign to save the tribe from the 1954 epidemic outbreak of enteric or typhoid fever.
 Special Achievement and Contribution to Public Health—The East African Bureau of Research in Medicine and Hygiene
 The British Colonial Medical Services at London; Ministry of Health and Housing, Kenya
 Recipient of coveted the United States National Institutes of Health (NIH),     Extramural (Medical) Research Program grant
 Twice Panelist at the East Africa High Commission Scientific Conference, Nairobi
 Panelist at a Rural Health Conference of the South Pacific Commission, Tahiti

Legacy 
After his death, the Kenyan Ministry of Health and Housing recommended that the Kenya Medical Training Centre at Nairobi be named in his honor and memory. However, the fratricidal tribal politics du jour prevented the Kenyan national legislative body from adopting the de jure process to implement this meritorious proposal by the Ministry of Health and Housing. A multipartite initiative has been relaunched to compel the sitting national government to abide by the 1966 intent to duly honor the memory of this consummate Kenyan statesman, and many other unheralded Kenyan patrons of his generation.

At present, he is commemorated by a family monument at Iboona village in Western Kenya.

Notes

References 

1931 births
1966 deaths
Kenyan public health doctors
People from Kisumu County
1960s disease outbreaks
Kenyan Luhya people
Kenya African National Union politicians
Kenyan murder victims
Male murder victims